F. Albert Bailey was an English professional rugby league footballer who played in the 1930s.

International honours
Albert Bailey won a cap for England while at St. Helens Recs in 1934 against France.

Outside of rugby league
Albert Bailey worked at Pilkington Brothers Limited.

References

England national rugby league team players
English rugby league players
Lancashire rugby league team players
Place of birth missing
Place of death missing
Rugby league centres
Rugby league players from St Helens, Merseyside
Rugby league second-rows
Rugby league wingers
St Helens Recreation RLFC captains
St Helens Recreation RLFC players
Year of birth missing
Year of death missing